The Women's Hammer Throw competition at the 2001 Summer Universiade took place on August 28 (qualification round) and August 30, 2001 in Beijing, PR China.

Medalists

Abbreviations
All results shown are in metres

Records

Results

Qualification

Final

See also
2001 Hammer Throw Year Ranking
2001 World Championships in Athletics – Women's hammer throw

References

 hammerthrow.wz.cz
 athletix

Hammer
2001 in women's athletics
2001